James Deighton was an English professional footballer who played as a goalkeeper.

Career
Deighton began his professional career with Everton but was unable to displace Ted Sagar from the first team. He moved to Cardiff City in 1935 and competed with Jock Leckie and George Poland during the 1935–36 season, making 18 league appearances. However, he was released by the club at the end of the season and moved into non-league football.

References

Year of birth missing
Date of death missing
Footballers from Liverpool
English footballers
Everton F.C. players
Cardiff City F.C. players
English Football League players
Association football goalkeepers